Ficus castellviana is a species of plant in the family Moraceae. It is found in Bolivia, Brazil, Colombia, and Peru.

References

castellviana
Least concern plants
Trees of Peru
Taxonomy articles created by Polbot